Collix elongata is a moth in the  family Geometridae. It is found on the Solomon Islands.

References

Moths described in 1902
elongata